Mohammad Ahsan (born 7 September 1987) is an Indonesian badminton player affiliated with Djarum club who specializes in the men's doubles. He is three-time World Champion, three-time season ending finals champion, and Asian Games gold medalist.

Joining the Djarum club since 2007, opened Ahsan's opportunity to join the Indonesian national team until he finally implemented it in the middle of 2008. Paired with Bona Septano, they managed to win the bronze medal at the 2011 BWF World Championships, and were ranked as high as sixth in the BWF World Rankings. Ahsan broke the world's men's doubles stage when he teamed-up with Hendra Setiawan. Ahsan and Setiawan partnership have collected 3 gold and 1 silver medals at the World Championships, a men's doubles gold in the Asian and Southeast Asian Games, and also three titles in the season ending finals. They reached a career high as world number 1.

There are several names, who have also paired with Ahsan such as Alvent Yulianto, where they won a bronze medal in the 2010 Asian Games; and winning a silver medal at the 2017 BWF World Championships 
with Rian Agung Saputro. As a member of the Indonesian national team, Ahsan also contributed to winning the men's team title at the Southeast Asian Games in 2009 and 2011; three consecutive Asia Team Championships title in 2016, 2018 and 2020; and also in the major international event, the Thomas Cup in 2020.

Early life 
Mohammad Ahsan was born in Palembang, South Sumatera to Tumin Atmadi dan Siti Rohanah. He is the youngest of three siblings. Ahsan started playing badminton at aged 5, trained at the Pusri club. After graduated from middle school, he moved to Jakarta for better training and a chance to develop his career as a badminton player. In 2001, he was selected to join the Ragunan sports school. Due to the change in the program at the school which will only focus on female athletes, Ahsan then decides to join the Bina Bangsa club.

Career

2005–2007: Career beginnings 
In the junior event, Mohammad Ahsan played at the 2005 Asian Junior Championships and won the bronze medals in the boys' team and doubles.

Ahsan became a member of Djarum club since 2007. In April, Ahsan made his debut at the Asian Championships held in Johor Bahru, Malaysia. Unfortunately, he and his partner, Bona Septano, were defeated in the early rounds. They later reached three consecutive finals in the Smiling Fish Thailand, Vietnam and Cheers Asian Singapore Internationals; and clinched their first international title as a pair in Vietnam. In August, he representing STIE Perbanas played at the Summer Universiade, and won a bronze medal in the mixed team event.

2008–2009: First Grand Prix title 
In July, Ahsan who representing North Maluku won a silver medal at the National Games in the men's doubles event with partner Fernando Kurniawan. Ahsan was selected to join Indonesia national training center in the middle of 2008. He was then reached his first Super Series finals with Bona Septano in the Japan Open where they faced Lars Paaske and Jonas Rasmussen, but lost the match in three games.

Ahsan and Bona Septano clinched their first Grand Prix title in the 2009 Philippines Open. He made his debut with the Indonesia national team at the Sudirman Cup, and won a bronze medal at that tournament. On his first appearance at the Southeast Asian Games, he contributing points for Indonesia in the final against Malaysia, secured a gold medal for the team, and a bronze medal in the men's doubles. Meanwhile, Ahsan and Septano debut at the World Championships had to be knocked out in the second round by the Chinese pair Guo Zhendong and Xu Chen. They also reaching the quarter-finals in some Super Series tournaments; the Korea, All England, and the French Opens.

2010–2011: Southeast Asian Games gold and World Championships bronze 
Ahsan made his debut with Indonesia team in the Thomas Cup in 2010. At that tournament, Indonesia reached the finals and won the silver medal after being defeated by the defending champion China. After his partner, Bona Septano, come back from injury, they had won two titles in a row in the Vietnam Grand Prix and Indonesia Grand Prix Gold in October. Ahsan then participated in the 2010 Asian Games, winning two bronze medals in the men's doubles with Alvent Yulianto and in the men;s team event. Ahsan and his partner, Septano, closed the 2010 season by winning the men's doubles title in the India Grand Prix.

In the first semester of 2011 season, Ahsan and Septano unable to win a title, since their best results were the semi-finalists in the Malaysia and Indonesia Opens, as well as the quarter-finalists in the All England, Swiss Open and the Malaysia Grand Prix Gold. Ahsan also took part at the Sudirman Cup, and prevented a clean sweep from Denmark, as he and Alvent Yulianto beating the current world number 1 Mathias Boe and Carsten Mogensen in straight games, but Indonesia lost 1–3 in the semifinals tie. In August, Ahsan and Septano captured the bronze medal at the BWF World Championships. The duo then reached their first final of the year in the Japan Open, but lost to current World Champions Cai Yun and Fu Haifeng. They managed to win their first title of the year, by defend the Indonesia Grand Prix Gold title, and then won the gold medals in the men's team and doubles events in the Southeast Asian Games. Another results for Ahsan and Septano in the rest of 2011 season were the quarter-finalists in the China Masters, French, and Macau Opens. They qualified to compete in the Super Series Finals in Liuzhou, China, but their pace at that tournament were stopped in the group stage.

2012–2013: Beginning of Ahsan and Setiawan partnership, World champions, and number 1 
In 2012, Ahsan and Septano partnership did not show satisfactory results, since they were unable to win any international tournaments, up to 2012 London Olympics when they were only able to finished the tournament as a quarter-finalists. In September, he played at the National Games for Central Java, and claimed two gold medals in the men's doubles and team events, and also a bronze in the mixed doubles. Ahsan then formed a new partnership with his senior, Hendra Setiawan. Ahsan and Setiawan debut were quite good as they finished as semi-finalists in the Denmark Open.

Ahsan and Setiawan campaign in 2013 looks promising. In January, they clinched their first title as a pair in the  Malaysia Open, beating the Korean pair Ko Sung-hyun and Lee Yong-dae in the final. They later won five tournaments in a row, started in the Australia Open in April;  the Indonesia and Singapore Opens in June, with another victory against Ko and Lee in both tournaments; the BWF World Championships in August; and later at the Japan Open in September. At the World Championships, they won the title without dropping a single game to their opponents on the way to the final. Their winning streak then stopped by youngster compatriot Ronald Alexander and Selvanus Geh in the quarter-finals of the Indonesia Grand Prix Gold. They then suffered back-to-back losses to Lee yong-dae with his new partner, Yoo Yeon-seong, in the final of the Denmark Open, first round of the China Open, and also in the semi-finals of the Hong Kong Open. The duo later won the season-ending tournament title, the BWF Superseries Finals, defeating Koreans Kim Gi-jung and Kim Sa-rang in straight sets. For their achievements in 2013, Setiawan and Ahsan took the number one position in the BWF world ranking in November 2013.

2014–2016: First All England title and Asian Games gold 
In March 2014, Ahsan and Setiawan won the All England Open after beating the Japanese paring of Hiroyuki Endo and Kenichi Hayakawa in the final. This is the first All England title for both players. They were included in the Indonesian squad at the 2014 Thomas Cup in New Delhi. At that tournament, Ahsan and Setiawan won their first match against Lee Yong-dae and Yoo Yeon-seong, and led Indonesia won 3–2 in the quarter-finals tie against South Korea. Indonesia was then defeated by Malaysia in the semi-finals. Ahsan and Setiawan again lost to Lee and Yoo in the finals of the Japan and Indonesia Opens. They then recorded their second win over the Korean pair Lee and Yoo in the men's doubles final of the 2014 Asian Games, claiming Ahsan's first ever Asian Games gold. In November, Ahsan and Setiawan won the Hong Kong Open. They later played at the invitational tournament, "Glory to the King", and won the men's doubles title after beating host pair Bodin Isara and Pakkawat Vilailak in the final.

Ahsan and Setiawan captured three titles in 2015, the Malaysia Open, BWF World Championships, and at the Dubai World Superseries Finals. Their victory begins with defeating Lee Yong-dae and Yoo Yeon-seong in the final of the Malaysia Open in April. At the Asian Championships, they reached the finals, losing out to top seed Lee and Yoo in a close rubber games. At the Sudirman Cup, they were able to contribute points for the Indonesian team, by defeating the four-time World Champions Cai Yun and Fu Haifeng, but China took the next 3 matches, so that Indonesia cannot advance to the final. Ahsan and Setiawan also stopped in the semi-finals of the Indonesia and Chinese Taipei Opens. The duo then won their second World Championships title as a pair, after winning the 2015 BWF World Championships in their home country. They defeated Lee and Yoo in straight games in the semi-finals and the Chinese pair Liu Xiaolong and Qiu Zihan in the final. After the World Championships, they were unable to give an accomplishment, with their best results being the semi-finalists in the French and Hong Kong Opens. Ahsan and Setiawan finally won their second season-ending title at the Dubai World Superseries Finals after defeating Chai Biao and Hong Wei in the finals.

Ahsan began the 2016 season by winning the Thailand Masters with Setiawan. He played at the Asia Team Championships, and helped Indonesia progress to the final round. Indonesia won the title after beating Japan in the final. He also competed at the Thomas Cup, and the team finished runner-up to Denmark. Ahsan made his second appearance at the Olympic Games by competed in the 2016 Rio with partner Setiawan as the second seeds, but the duo were eliminated in the group stage. The duo split after the 2016 Korea Open Super Series, ending their four years partnership. Ahsan was then partnered with Berry Angriawan. His partnership with Angriawan was short-lived and he was then paired with Rian Agung Saputro.

2017–2018: Ahsan-Saputro World silver medalist; Ahsan-Setiawan reunite: "The Daddies"  
Ahsan and Saputro's first international title was in 2017 China International. They later won silver at the 2017 BWF World Championships. In the Superseries event tournaments, Ahsan and Saputro have not been able to show consistency in their matches, and their best result during the season were being a semi-finalists in the China Open. Ahsan and Setiawan paired back again in the end of 2017, to compete in the Indonesian National Championships. They emerged victorious at that competition after beating Frengky Wijaya Putra and Sabar Karyaman Gutama in the final.

Opened the 2018 season by competing in the Indonesia Masters, Ahsan, who was paired with Angga Pratama, had to suffer a defeat in the first round by Mads Conrad-Petersen and Mads Pieler Kolding. Ahsan and Pratama then managed to contribute point for Indonesia as the first men's doubles in the Asia Team Championships final, and the team thrashing China 3–1 to retain the title. After Setiawan returns to the national training center, Ahsan and Setiawan officially reunited to compete at the international level. Their nickname is "The Daddies" because both of them have started families and often show affection towards their children. Their first title came from the Malaysia International Challenge, where they upsetting host pair Aaron Chia and Soh Wooi Yik in the final. At the 2018 Thomas Cup, Ahsan with Indonesia men's team failed to win the title after losing out to China 1–3 in the semi-finals. In July, the duo won their first World Tour title in the Singapore Open by beating Ou Xuanyi and Ren Xiangyu of China. In the rest of 2018 tournaments, Setiawan and Ahsan best results were being semi-finalists in the Denmark, Fuzhou China, and the Hong Kong Opens. The duo qualified to compete at the World Tour Finals, but at that tournament, they were eliminated in the group stage. He and his partner ended the 2018 season ranked as world number 9.

2019: Second All England title and third World Championships title 
Ahsan and Setiawan were one of the most dominant pairs in the 2019 season, where they entered 11 finals and became the first men's doubles pair to win 3 major titles in a year. Their achievements started at the Indonesia Masters, when the duo finished runner-up to their junior compatriot Marcus Fernaldi Gideon and Kevin Sanjaya Sukamuljo. The first victory came from the All England Open, when they defeating Malaysia's Chia and Soh in the final. This was their second All England title as a pair. They then lost in the finals of the Singapore Open to Takeshi Kamura and Keigo Sonoda of Japan. Ahsan and Setiawan captured their second World Tour title of the year in the New Zealand Open when they beating Japanese pairing of Hiroyuki Endo and Yuta Watanabe in a close rubber games. Ahsan also participated in his sixth Sudirman Cup, and took the bronze medal after Indonesia being defeated by Japan in the semi-finals. In July, they reached two finals in the Indonesia and Japan Opens and come off second-best to Gideon and Sukamuljo in both tournaments. In late August, Ahsan captured his third World Championships title. He and his partner, Setiawan, won the BWF World Championships, defeated the up and coming Japanese duo Takuro Hoki and Yugo Kobayashi in the final. These results also took them to move up to second place in the BWF rankings. They were again confronted by the youngster Gideon and Sukamuljo in the final of the China and Denmark Opens. Ahsan and Setiawan have never won a match against Gideon and Sukamuljo in the last 5 meetings in 2019. They also suffered losses in the final round of the Hong Kong Open, this time by a Korean pair Choi Sol-gyu and Seo Seung-jae. At the end of the year, Ahsan and Setiawan defeated Endo and Watanabe in straight games to win the BWF World Tour Finals.

2020–2022: First Thomas Cup 
Ahsan and his partner, Hendra Setiawan opened the 2020 season as the semi-finalists in the Malaysia Masters. They then reached the finals of the Indonesia Masters, but still unable to overcome the pressing game from Gideon and Sukamuljo, and accepted defeat in straight games. At the All England Open, the duo were unable to defend the title after being stopped in the quarter-finals by Japanese pair Endo and Watanabe. Ahsan also played at the decision match at the 2020 Asia Team Championships, where Ahsan who was paired with Fajar Alfian ended the match by defeating Ong Yew Sin and Teo Ee Yi in straight games, and led Indonesia won 3–1 in the finals tie against Malaysia.

In January 2021, Ahsan and Setiawan competed at the 2020 Asian Leg tournament held in Thailand. They first reached the quarter-finals in the Yonex Thailand Open, and then finished as semi-finalists in the Toyota Thailand Open. The duo qualified to play at the BWF World Tour Finals, and reached the final after being able to avenge the defeat to the Korean pair Choi Sol-gyu and Seo Seung-jae from the Yonex Thailand Open, but lost the finals to the Chinese Taipei pair Lee Yang and Wang Chi-lin who previously beat them at the Toyota Thailand Open. In July 2021, Ahsan made his third appearance at the Summer Olympics, at Tokyo 2020. Competing with Setiawan as the 2nd seeds, he finished fourth after being defeated by Malaysia's Aaron Chia and Soh Wooi Yik in the bronze medal match. In October, at Aarhus, Denmark, Ahsan was part of Indonesia winning team in the Thomas Cup, where the team beat China in the final 3–0, claiming Indonesia's first title in 19 years. Their best results in the rest of 2021 season were reaching the quarter-finals in the French and Hylo Opens.

Ahsan and Setiawan began the 2022 season as finalists in the India Open. They then stormed into their third All England final. They lost to compatriots Muhammad Shohibul Fikri and Bagas Maulana in the final. At the Korea Open, they lost in the semi-finals to Seo Seung-jae who this time paired with Kang Min-hyuk. They then reached their second final of the year in the Malaysia Masters, but have not been able to top the podium after being defeated by their compatriot Fajar Alfian and Muhammad Rian Ardianto. Later in August, Ahsan and Setiawan entered their fourth BWF World Championships final as a pair. They lost to Malaysia's Chia and Soh in straight games, 19–21, 14–21, after initially leading 19–16 in the first game, eventually losing in 40 minutes.

2023 
Ahsan and his partner, Hendra Setiawan opened the 2023 season at the Malaysia Open, but defeated in the quarter-finals round to Korean pair Kang Min-hyuk and Seo Seung-jae. In the next tournament, they lost the first round of India Open from unseeded Chinese pair Liang Weikeng and Wang Chang. They competed in the home tournament, Indonesia Masters, but unfortunately lost in the second round from fellow Indonesian pair Leo Rolly Carnando and Daniel Marthin.

Awards and nominations

Achievements

BWF World Championships 
Men's doubles

Asian Games 
Men's doubles

Asian Championships 
Men's doubles

Southeast Asian Games 
Men's doubles

World University Championships 
Men's doubles

Asian Junior Championships 
Men's doubles

BWF World Tour (4 titles, 14 runners-up) 
The BWF World Tour, which was announced on 19 March 2017 and implemented in 2018, is a series of elite badminton tournaments sanctioned by the Badminton World Federation (BWF). The BWF World Tour is divided into levels of World Tour Finals, Super 1000, Super 750, Super 500, Super 300, and the BWF Tour Super 100.

Men's doubles

BWF Superseries (9 titles, 5 runners-up) 
The BWF Superseries, which was launched on 14 December 2006 and implemented in 2007, was a series of elite badminton tournaments, sanctioned by the Badminton World Federation (BWF). BWF Superseries levels were Superseries and Superseries Premier. A season of Superseries consisted of twelve tournaments around the world that had been introduced since 2011. Successful players were invited to the Superseries Finals, which were held at the end of each year.

Men's doubles

  BWF Superseries Finals tournament
  BWF Superseries Premier tournament
  BWF Superseries tournament

BWF Grand Prix (6 titles, 1 runner-up) 
The BWF Grand Prix had two levels, the Grand Prix and Grand Prix Gold. It was a series of badminton tournaments sanctioned by the Badminton World Federation (BWF) and played between 2007 and 2017.

Men's doubles

  BWF Grand Prix Gold tournament
  BWF Grand Prix tournament

BWF International Challenge/Series (3 titles, 2 runners-up) 
Men's doubles

  BWF International Challenge tournament
  BWF International Series tournament

Performance timeline

National team 
 Junior level

 Senior level

Individual competitions 
<div style="overflow: auto;">
 Junior level

 Senior level

Record against selected opponents 
Men's doubles results against World Superseries finalists, World Superseries Finals semifinalists, World Championships semifinalists, and Olympic quarterfinalists paired with:

Rian Agung Saputro 

  Li Junhui & Liu Yuchen 1–1
  Mathias Boe & Carsten Mogensen 0–1
  Ricky Karanda Suwardi & Angga Pratama 1–0
  Takeshi Kamura & Keigo Sonoda 1-1
  Goh V Shem & Tan Wee Kiong 1–0

Bona Septano 

  Cai Yun & Xu Chen 0–1
  Chai Biao & Guo Zhendong 1–4
  Fu Haifeng & Cai Yun 0–5
  Guo Zhendong & Xie Zhongbo 0–1
  Guo Zhendong & Xu Chen 0–3
  Hong Wei & Shen Ye 0–2
  Liu Xiaolong & Qiu Zihan 5–1
  Fang Chieh-min & Lee Sheng-mu 3–2
  Lars Paaske & Jonas Rasmussen 1–2
  Mads Conrad-Petersen & Jonas Rasmussen 1–0
  Mathias Boe & Carsten Mogensen 1–5
  Anthony Clark & Nathan Robertson 0–3
  Angga Pratama & Rian Agung Saputro 2–1
  Hendra Aprida Gunawan & Alvent Yulianto 2–1
  Markis Kido & Hendra Setiawan 1–1
  Rian Sukmawan & Yonathan Suryatama Dasuki 2–1
  Hirokatsu Hashimoto & Noriyasu Hirata 1–0
  Kenichi Hayakawa & Hiroyuki Endo 4–0
  Shintaro Ikeda & Shuichi Sakamoto 1–1
  Cho Gun-woo & Kwon Yi-goo 1–0
  Jung Jae-sung & Lee Yong-dae 0–3
  Ko Sung-hyun & Yoo Yeon-seong 1–5
  Chan Chong Ming & Chew Choon Eng 0–1
  Chan Chong Ming & Koo Kien Keat 0–1
  Choong Tan Fook & Lee Wan Wah 1–1
  Gan Teik Chai & Lin Woon Fui 1–0
  Goh V Shem & Lim Khim Wah 1–1
  Hoon Thien How & Tan Wee Kiong 0–1
  Koo Kien Keat & Tan Boon Heong 3–2
  Mohd Zakry Abdul Latif & Mohd Fairuzizuan Mohd Tazari 2–1
  Bodin Isara & Maneepong Jongjit 1–1
  Howard Bach & Tony Gunawan 1–0

Hendra Setiawan 

  Cai Yun & Fu Haifeng 4–1
  Chai Biao & Hong Wei 2–2
  Fu Haifeng & Zhang Nan 3–5
  Li Junhui & Liu Yuchen 5–7
  Liu Xiaolong & Qiu Zihan 3–2
  Ou Xuanyi & Ren Xiangyu 2–0
  Lee Sheng-mu & Tsai Chia-hsin 7–1
  Mathias Boe & Carsten Mogensen 5–1
  Marcus Ellis & Chris Langridge 4–0
  Johannes Schöttler & Ingo Kindervater 1–0
  Fajar Alfian & Muhammad Rian Ardianto 1–1
  Marcus Fernaldi Gideon & Kevin Sanjaya Sukamuljo 2–11
  Markis Kido & Marcus Fernaldi Gideon 3–0
  Angga Pratama & Rian Agung Saputro 2–1
  Hiroyuki Endo & Kenichi Hayakawa 9–1
  Hiroyuki Endo & Yuta Watanabe 6–2
  Takuro Hoki & Yugo Kobayashi 3–2
  Takeshi Kamura & Keigo Sonoda 5–2
  Kim Gi-jung & Kim Sa-rang 6–2
  Ko Sung-hyun & Lee Yong-dae 3–0
  Ko Sung-hyun & Shin Baek-cheol 3–3
  Lee Yong-dae & Yoo Yeon-seong 6–7
  Aaron Chia & Soh Wooi Yik 7–3
  Goh V Shem & Tan Wee Kiong 7–1
  Koo Kien Keat & Tan Boon Heong 1–2
  Vladimir Ivanov & Ivan Sozonov 5–0

References

External links 
 
 
 Mohammad Ahsan at BadmintonLink.com
 Ahsan Mohammad at gz2010.cn (official website of the 2010 Asian Games)
 

1987 births
Living people
20th-century Indonesian people
21st-century Indonesian people
People from Palembang
Sportspeople from South Sumatra
Indonesian male badminton players
Badminton players at the 2012 Summer Olympics
Badminton players at the 2016 Summer Olympics
Badminton players at the 2020 Summer Olympics
Olympic badminton players of Indonesia
Badminton players at the 2010 Asian Games
Badminton players at the 2014 Asian Games
Badminton players at the 2018 Asian Games
Asian Games gold medalists for Indonesia
Asian Games silver medalists for Indonesia
Asian Games bronze medalists for Indonesia
Asian Games medalists in badminton
Medalists at the 2010 Asian Games
Medalists at the 2014 Asian Games
Medalists at the 2018 Asian Games
Competitors at the 2009 Southeast Asian Games
Competitors at the 2011 Southeast Asian Games
Southeast Asian Games gold medalists for Indonesia
Southeast Asian Games bronze medalists for Indonesia
Southeast Asian Games medalists in badminton
Universiade bronze medalists for Indonesia
Universiade medalists in badminton
Medalists at the 2007 Summer Universiade
World No. 1 badminton players